Pompeiana is a comune (municipality) in the Province of Imperia in the Italian region Liguria, situated about  southwest of Genoa and about  southwest of Imperia.

Pompeiana borders the following municipalities: Castellaro, Cipressa, Pietrabruna, Riva Ligure, Santo Stefano al Mare, and Terzorio.

Demographic evolution

References

Cities and towns in Liguria